Arantia is a genus of bush crickets in the tribe Holochlorini, erected by Carl Stål in 1874, with species found in tropical Africa.

Species
Arantia accrana Karsch, 1889
Arantia angustipennis Chopard, 1954
Arantia brevipes Chopard, 1954
Arantia congensis Griffini, 1908
Arantia dentata Saussure, 1899
Arantia excelsior Karsch, 1889
Arantia fasciata Walker, 1869
Arantia fatidica (Stål, 1873)- type species (as Holochlora fatidica Stål)
Arantia gabunensis Brunner von Wattenwyl, 1891
Arantia gestri Griffini, 1906
Arantia hydatinoptera Karsch, 1889
Arantia incerata Karsch, 1893
Arantia latifolia Karsch, 1890
Arantia leptocnemis Karsch, 1890
Arantia mammisignum Karsch, 1896
Arantia manca Bolívar, 1906
Arantia marmorata Karsch, 1889
Arantia mauritiana Saussure, 1899
Arantia melanotus Sjöstedt, 1902
Arantia orthocnemis Karsch, 1890
Arantia ovalipennis Chopard, 1954
Arantia rectifolia Brunner von Wattenwyl, 1878
Arantia regina Karsch, 1889
Arantia retinervis Karsch, 1889
Arantia scurra Karsch, 1896
Arantia simplicinervis Karsch, 1889
Arantia tigrina Bolívar, 1906
Arantia ugandana Rehn, 1914

References

External links
 

Tettigoniidae genera
Phaneropterinae